Government Jawaharlal Nehru College, Lakshadweep, is a general degree college located in Kadmat Island, Lakshadweep. It was established in 1972. The college is affiliated with Calicut University. This college offers different courses in arts, commerce and science.

Departments

Science

Physics
Chemistry
Mathematics

Arts and Commerce

Malayalam
English
History
Commerce

Accreditation
The college is  recognized by the University Grants Commission (UGC).

References

External links
http://www.universityofcalicut.info/news/LDCell.pdf

Universities and colleges in Lakshadweep
Colleges affiliated with the University of Calicut
Educational institutions established in 1972